Willenhall is a suburb of Coventry in the West Midlands of England.

Willenhall is in the south-east of the city adjacent to the suburbs of Binley, Ernesford Grange and Whitley. It covers the area bounded by the Rugby to Coventry railway line, the River Sowe and the city's boundary with Warwickshire.

For general election purposes it is part of the Coventry South Constituency and for local elections it forms part of the Binley and Willenhall ward on Coventry City Council. The population of this ward at the 2011 census was 16,991.

Willenhall was originally a small village that was absorbed into the city as it expanded. During the Second World War the Chace National Service Hostel was built in the area to accommodate the influx of munitions workers to the City. After the war the estate became established with the building of a large number of council houses. The area today remains mainly residential though to the south-east there is 9 hectares of woodland called Willenhall Wood which has been designated a nature reserve.

Willenhall is the location of the Chace Avenue police station that forms part of the Coventry Local Policing Team of the West Midlands Police and houses the Binley and Willenhall neighbourhood team.

Education

Willenhall has 3 Primary schools :
St. Anne's RC
Stretton Church of England
Willenhall Community

For Secondary education the pupils of the above primary schools normally advance to :
Bishop Ullathorne RC School
Ernesford Grange School & Community College
Whitley Abbey Community School

Religion

The Church of England parish church for Willenhall is St John the Divine which celebrated its 50th anniversary in 2007. The area is also served by St Anne’s Roman Catholic Church and Willenhall Free Church which is affiliated with the FIEC.

Rioting
In May 1992, rioting that began in the Wood End and Hillfields areas of the city spread into Willenhall.

Air crash

Willenhall was the site of a major air crash when at 9:52 a.m. on 21 December 1994 an aircraft approaching Coventry Airport, in poor visibility, crashed into Willenhall Wood, killing all five crew on board.
The aircraft was a Boeing 737 that was owned and operated by Air Algerie but leased by Phoenix Aviation to undertake a number of live veal calf export flights from the airport.

A brass plaque remembering the event is now located in Middle Ride, close to the crash scene, which was erected on the crash’s 10th anniversary by the Willenhall Wood Residents Association.

Gallery

References

External links

Virtual Museum, Willenhall, Coventry
Chace Avenue (M2) operational command unit

Suburbs of Coventry
Aviation accidents and incidents locations in England